The  is an 8.0 km railway line in the western suburbs of Tokyo operated by the private railway operator Seibu Railway. The line connects Musashi-Sakai Station on the Chūō Main Line with Koremasa Station along the Tama River. The line has only six stations and is not connected to any other part of the Seibu Railway system. The line is single-track: trains traveling in opposite directions pass each other as necessary at the stations, which are double-tracked.

Although the line is short, it provides access to the Tokyo University of Foreign Studies, the Tokyo Racecourse, the Ajinomoto Stadium, the Tokyo Metropolitan Police Department police school, many cemeteries (including Tokyo's largest, Tama Cemetery), the American School in Japan, and the Tama River.

Stations

Rolling Stock

As of March 2010, the line's services are operated exclusively by a fleet of 16 New 101 Series. These trains are wrapped with different liveries on various occasions. However, the New 101 Series trains typically operate a white livery.

Liveries

Izu Hakone Color

To commemorate the 100th anniversary of the opening of the Tamagawa Line from 2017 to 2018, which coincided with the 100th anniversary of the Izu Hakone Railway, the two lines celebrated by adopting each other's liveries.

Akaden painting

By request from a questionnaire at the 100th-anniversary event of the Tamagawa Line, from January 24, 2018, Seibu Railway's old livery "Akaden Paint" (red x beige) was used.

Two-tone color 

From April 18, 2018, the trains were reprinted with the two-tone color of yellow x beige. The paint color is derived from the livery that was used during the time of the debut of the New 101 series train. The livery was also used before the fleet renewal of 2010, as the Old 101 Series train was featured in the same livery. This livery was the most requested after Akaden painting in the questionnaire at the 100th-anniversary event of Tamagawa Line. 

Omi Railway Color (1251 formation)

From July 11, 2018, To commemorate the 120th anniversary of the Ohmi Railway and the 100th anniversary of the Tamagawa line a wrapping featuring the "Mizuumifugo" (light blue) livery was introduced.

Former Rolling Stock

Before the New 101 series, the line's services were operated by the Old 101 series, which were in use from 1996 to 2010. These trains originally were introduced as "One-Man" (ワンマン) services. Prior to the One-Man train service on the New 101 Series The following trains were also used: The 401 series, 701 series, which had been transferred from the Shinjuku line system to the Tamagawa line, and the 451 series, 551 series, and the 571 series, which were called Akaden trains due to their red and beige livery.

History
The first section of the line, between Musashi-Sakai and Kita-Tama Station (present-day Shiraitodai Station), opened on 22 October 1917. The line was extended to Koremasa on 20 June 1922. In 1927, the company was absorbed by the Seibu Railway. The entire line was electrified in 1950. Freight operations ceased in 1967.

References
This article incorporates material from the corresponding article in the Japanese Wikipedia.

External links
Seibu-Tamagawa Line Guide: information on stations and their neighbours, tickets, and transfers in both English and Japanese

 
Railway lines in Tokyo
Tamagawa Line
1067 mm gauge railways in Japan
Railway lines opened in 1917